Each national team submitted a squad of 20 players, two of whom had to be goalkeepers.

Players in boldface have been capped at full international level since the tournament.

Ages are as of the start of the tournament, 14 July 2019.

Group A

Armenia

Head coach: Artur Voskanyan

Italy
Italy named their squad on 9 July 2019.

Head coach: Carmine Nunziata

Portugal
Head coach: Filipe

Spain
Spain named their squad on 10 July 2019.

Head coach: Santiago Denia

Group B

Czech Republic
Czech Republic named their squad on 9 July 2019.

Head coach: Jan Suchopárek

France

Head coach: Lionel Rouxel

Republic of Ireland

Head coach: Tom Mohan

Norway

Head coach: Gunnar Halle

References

2019 UEFA European Under-19 Championship
UEFA European Under-19 Championship squads